Abdessadek Rabiaa or Rabii ( – born 5 February 1945, Marrakech) was a Moroccan politician and civil servant. Since 1993 he has been Secretary General of the Government, a position he held until his death on 12 August 2008. He held a degree in law from the Université de Bordeaux and practiced as a lawyer for some time in the 1970s.

See also
Cabinet of Morocco

References

Government ministers of Morocco
1945 births
People from Marrakesh
20th-century Moroccan lawyers
2008 deaths
University of Bordeaux alumni